Carabus tibetanophilus is a species of black-coloured ground beetle in the Carabinae subfamily.

References

tibetanophilus
Beetles described in 1991